Deshabandu Gammana Patabendige Don John Abeywickrama (Sinhala:ජෝ අබේවික්‍රම) (22 June 1927 – 21 September 2011), popularly as Joe Abeywickrama, was an actor in Sri Lankan cinema, theater and television. Initially famed as a comedic actor in early 1950s, Abeywickrama became one of the greatest film actors of alltime in Sinhala cinema with several critically acclaimed award winning dramatic performances.

He has won 18 Sarasavi Awards and Presidential Awards. At the 1999 Singapore International Film Festival, Abeywickrama won a Silver Screen Award for Best Asian Actor for his portrayal of a grieving father in Pura Handa Kaluwara (English: Death on a Full Moon Day), a first for a Sri Lankan.

He is also widely known as a Crowned king of Sri Lankan cinema history and he was the second to die of the three crowned cinema heroes. (the first cinema king to die was Gamini Fonseka and last of three to die was Tony Ranasinghe. He is the first Sri Lankan actor to ever participated for Filmfare Film Festival, where he participated in 1966.

Personal life
Abeywickrama was born on 22 June 1927 in Lellopitiya, Ratnapura, Sri Lanka and grew up in a rural area. He was the eldest of four children. His surroundings instilled in him a strong appreciation of nature and hard work. His father was a close companionship with John D'oyly, where Joe got his name.

He completed primary education at Dippitigala Mixed School near Lellopitiya. Then he studied at Sivali Central College, Ratnapura for a short period of time. He completed secondary education at St. Aloysius College, Ratnapura.

After education, he worked as the Manager of Lellopitiya Co-operative. In the 1940s he settled in Colombo and started working for Sirisena Wimalaweera's studio Nawajeewana. Initially limited to doing office chores, Abeywickrama eventually became involved in films screened in Ratnapura by the studio. He made contacts with film industry insiders while with the studio, and on his leave obtained a role in Devasundari.

Career
Abeywickrama began his acting career in stage plays. In 1955, he made his film acting debut with a comedy role in Devasundari directed by M.H. Munas, a Sri Lankan who made films from India. Abeywickrama's first notable role was in Saradama directed by T. Somasekaran as an eccentric police officer who collected ants. He obtained the role with the help of his friend Florida Jayalath and considers it to be his first real role and a turning point in his career. He was a comedian in all of his early films with some notable roles in the films Sirimalee, Nalangana, Pirimiyek Nisa, Kolamba Sanniya and Daruwa Kageda. Then he was invited to play a major role in the film Ranmuthu Duwa in 1962, where he acted with Gamini Fonseka for the first time. In 1956, he made a role of "comedy detective" in the film Shri 296 directed by Premnath Moraes.

In the preceding years, he appeared in many dramatic roles in several critically acclaimed films such as Deepashika, Soldadu Unnehe, Chandiya, Sweep Ticket, Allapu Gedara, Ektam Ge, and Saravita. In 1965, he won the award for the Best Actor at the Sarasaviya Awards for his role "Sarayya" in the film Saravita. In 1971, he acted in the film Welikathara directed by D. B. Nihalsinghe, where he played the role of "Gorin Mudalali". The film received several awards at local film festivals and considered one of the Ten Best Sri Lankan films of all time. He also starred in Mahagama Sekera's Tun Man Handiya in 1970. His other notable acting came through Getawarayo as "Semaneris", and in Sadol Kandulu as "dumb servant". For his role in the film Sadol Kandulu, he later won the Sarasaviya Award for the Best Actor. He won forty awards including both international and local film festivals.

In the film Beddegama directed by Lester James Peries, he played a critically acclaimed role as "Silindu". In 1982, the character gave him another Sarasviya Award as the Best Actor. His character "Nirudaka" in the film Desa Nisa is also received critics acclaim. He also appeared in two English films titled Peter of the Elephants and The Three Yellow Cats. In 2001, he acted in the film Pura Handa Kaluwara directed by Prasanna Vithanage. The film is considered a hallmark in Sinhala cinema history. He won the Best Actor award at 12th Singapore International Film Festival for his role "Wannihami"  in the film. His final film role came through the war drama film Selvam. Until his death, he has acted in 172 films where 62 of them as leading actor and rest 110 as a supporting actor. He was also the first Sri Lankan actor to attend the Filmfare Awards in India.

Apart from cinema, he also appeared in few stage dramas such as: Mal Yahanawa, Beri Sil (1960) and Kele Mal (1962). He also acted in many television serials such as Andu Kola, Vanas Pathi, Gamperaliya, Sakisanda Eliyas and Esala Kaluwara. He also made the script for the popular comedy serial Sabada Pabilis. In the serial, he also wrote the theme song, "Una Puruke Balu Walige" sung by lead actor Anton Jude. Meanwhile, he also sang the song "Wel Eliyata' in the tele drama Thahanchi. one of his television production. In 2004, he wrote the script of television serial Sakisanda Eliyas.

Author work
Abeywickrama published his first novel Maha Bambata Muhunu Dekai in 1972.

Legacy
On 21 September 2020, a special commemorative event was held on the ninth death anniversary of Joe Abeywickrema. It was organized by The National Film Corporation and was held at the NFC Auditorium at 6 pm. After the event, one of his popular film Thun Mang Handiya was screened.

Filmography

Awards

Presidential Film Awards

|-
|| 1965 ||| Getawarayo || Merit Award ||   
|-
|| 1966 ||| Saaravita || Best Actor ||  
|-
|| 1982 ||| Beddegama || Best Actor  ||   
|-
|| 1983 ||| Malata Noena Bambaru || Best Actor  || 
|-
|| 1986 ||| Contribution to cinema || Rana Thisara Award  ||  
|-
|| 1987 ||| Maldeniye Simieon || Best Actor  ||  
|-
|| 1991 ||| Palama Yata || Best Supporting Actor  || 
|-
|| 1992 ||| Golu Muhude Kunatuwak || Best Actor   || 
|-
|| 1993 ||| Umayangana || Best Actor  || 
|-
|| 1997 ||| Bithu Sithuwam || Best Actor   || 
|-
|| 1998 ||| Bithu Sithuvam || Best Actor  ||  
|-
|| 2001 ||| Purahanda Kaluwara || Best Actor ||

Presidential Film Awards

|-
|| 1979 ||| Bambaru Evith || Merit Award  ||  
|-
|| 1980 ||| Wasanthaye Dawasak || Best Supporting Actor ||  
|-
|| 1981 ||| Siribo Ayya || Best Actor ||  
|-
|| 1982 ||| Beddegama || Best Actor ||  
|-
|| 1983 ||| Malata Noena Bambaru || Best Actor ||

Singapore International Film Festival

|-
|| 1999 ||| Pura Handa Kaluwara || Silver Screen Award for Best Actor ||

Presidential Film Awards

|-
|| 1999 ||| Contribution to Drama || U.W. Sumathipala Lifetime 
|-
|| 2000 ||| Imadiya Mankada || Best Teledrama Actor ||

Sri Lankan National Honours

|-
|| 2005 ||| Contribution to Drama || Deshabandu||

References

External links
 
Joe Abeywickrama's Biography in Sinhala Films Database
Joe Abeywickrama's Biography in Sinhala
Joe Abeywickrama in Sinhala
Official Website - National Film Corporation of Sri Lanka
Vehera ඇගයූ මහා ප්‍රතිභාව 
ජෝ අබේවික්‍රම 9 වැනි ගුණ සමරුව

1927 births
2011 deaths
Sri Lankan male film actors
Sinhalese male actors
Deshabandu